Javier 'Javi' Jiménez Camarero (born 8 June 1987) is a Spanish professional footballer who plays as a goalkeeper for Uzbekistan Super League club Surkhon Termez.

Club career
Born in Logroño, La Rioja, Jiménez joined Real Valladolid in 2008 from Deportivo Alavés. During three seasons, he played for the Castile and León side's reserves in both the Segunda División B and the Tercera División.

Jiménez started training regularly with the first team in 2010–11. On 29 January 2011 he made his Segunda División debut, being sent off in a 2–0 away loss against Villarreal CF B. He finished the campaign as first choice, and appeared in the promotion playoffs against Elche CF in an eventual 3–2 aggregate defeat.

After two seasons in the second division with Real Murcia, appearing in 40 games in his second to suffer relegation but later reinstatement, Jiménez moved to La Liga in the summer of 2013 by signing with Levante UD for three years. He made his first appearance in the competition on 24 November, replacing field player Jordi Xumetra in the early stages of an eventual 0–3 home loss to Villarreal CF after Keylor Navas was sent off.

On 1 September 2014, Jiménez was loaned to second-tier club AD Alcorcón in a season-long deal. On 19 August of the following year, he terminated his contract at the Estadi Ciutat de València and joined Elche CF hours later.

Jiménez signed a two-year deal with SD Huesca also in division two on 5 July 2016. On 26 July of the following year, after spending the campaign nursing a knee injury, he terminated his contract.

A very brief spell in Norway with Tromsø IL notwithstanding, Jiménez competed in the Spanish third tier until his retirement.

References

External links

1987 births
Living people
Spanish twins
Twin sportspeople
Sportspeople from Logroño
Spanish footballers
Footballers from La Rioja (Spain)
Association football goalkeepers
La Liga players
Segunda División players
Segunda División B players
Tercera División players
Deportivo Alavés B players
Real Valladolid Promesas players
Real Valladolid players
Real Murcia players
Levante UD footballers
AD Alcorcón footballers
Elche CF players
SD Huesca footballers
UCAM Murcia CF players
Atlético Sanluqueño CF players
Algeciras CF footballers
Salamanca CF UDS players
Tromsø IL players
Uzbekistan Super League players
Surkhon Termez players
Spanish expatriate footballers
Expatriate footballers in Norway
Expatriate footballers in Uzbekistan
Spanish expatriate sportspeople in Norway